The  was a fleet of the Imperial Japanese Navy established during World War II.

Structure

Commanders 
Commander in chief

Chief of staff

Bibliography
The Maru Special series,  (Japan)
Ships of the World series, (Japan)

Fleets of the Imperial Japanese Navy
Units of the Imperial Japanese Navy Air Service
Military units and formations established in 1943
Military units and formations disestablished in 1944